The 1996–97 Women's National Soccer League was the first season of the Women's National Soccer League, the former top Australian women's professional soccer league, since its establishment in 1996.

Teams
Six teams competed in the league – three teams in two groups.

Group 1
 ACT Academy of Sport
 SA Sports Institute
 Victoria ITC

Group 2
 Northern NSW ITC
 NSW Institute of Sport
 Queensland Academy of Sport

League tables

Results

Fifth place play-off

Third place play-off

Grand Final

Season statistics

Scoring

Top scorers

Hat-tricks

References
 
 

1996 in Australian soccer
1997 in Australian soccer